Richard Leonard Adams (29 March 1838 – 11 April 1897) was an English first-class cricketer. Adams's batting and bowling styles are unknown.

Adams was born at Bath, Somerset, and educated at Westminster School.  He later studied at Christ's College, Cambridge, where he made a single appearance in first-class cricket for the university cricket club against Cambridge Town Club at Parker's Piece in 1859. He batted once during Cambridge University's first-innings, scoring a single run before he was dismissed by Frederick Reynolds.  He took the wickets of Charles Pryor and Joseph Masterson in the Cambridge Town Club first-innings, however due to an incomplete match scorecard his exact bowling figures are unknown.

Adams became an Anglican priest and was vicar of Framfield 1866–76, then rector of Shere 1876–93. He died at Cockington, Devon on 11 April 1897.

References

External links 
Richard Adams at ESPNcricinfo
Richard Adams at CricketArchive

1838 births
1897 deaths
Sportspeople from Bath, Somerset
People educated at Westminster School, London
Alumni of Christ's College, Cambridge
English cricketers
Cambridge University cricketers
19th-century English Anglican priests
People from Framfield